Naiki, or Southeastern Kolami, is a tribal Central Dravidian language used in Maharashtra state of India.  Dialects are Naiki proper, or Chanda, and Naikṛi (Krishnamurti 2003:57)

Phonology

Vowels

Consonants

References

Dravidian languages
Endangered languages of India